The Somali sharp-snouted worm lizard (Ancylocranium somalicum) is a species of amphisbaenian in the family Amphisbaenidae. The species is found in Somalia and  Ethiopia.

References

Ancylocranium
Reptiles described in 1930
Taxa named by Giuseppe Scortecci